KDOV is a non-commercial radio station in Medford, Oregon, broadcasting to the Medford-Ashland, Oregon area on 91.7 FM. KDOV airs Christian contemporary music and religious programming. It is owned by United Christian Broadcasters, through licensee UCB USA, Inc.

KDOV has a sister television station, KDSO-LD.

Programming
In addition to music blocks supervised by music director and on-air talent Jerry Bilden, TheDove Radio airs segments from various Christian ministers such as Dr. Charles Stanley, the late Charles Colson, the late Dr. James Kennedy and others. They also broadcast live local church services from Parkview Christian Center in Grants Pass. Flagship programs for TheDove include Mornings on TheDove and Focus Today (simulcast with the TV station and KCMX Radio), both hosted by station president Perry Atkinson. There also local news updates with news director Steve Johnson and news reporter Ashley Carrasco.

Local sports coverage
KDOV also serves as the flagship radio station for Cascade Christian High School varsity football and boys basketball with sports director Jim McCoy and talent Mark McLemore providing play-by-play. It debuted Cascade Christian baseball on May 29, 2012, with the OSAA Class 3A Playoff game against Bandon/Pacific and also carried the state championship game versus Santiam Christian just days later.

On-Air Talent
 Perry Atkinson - Host, Mornings on TheDove, Focus Today, Afternoons on TheDove
 Polina (Yemelyanova) Leiser - Co-Host / Executive Producer, Mornings on TheDove
 Jerry Bilden - Music Director / On-Air Talent
 Steve Johnson - News Director / Co-Host, Mornings on TheDove
 Ashley Carrasco - News Anchor / Reporter, Mornings on TheDove (formerly on KTVL)

Former On-Air
 Steve Best - On-Air Talent
 Leon Hunsaker - Meteorologist (formerly of KOBI-TV and KTVL, died 2022)
 Jim McCoy - Play-By-Play Commentator for Cascade Christian High School football and boys basketball (radio only)
 Demi DeSoto - News Anchor / Reporter, Mornings on TheDove (formerly on KTVL)

Board of directors
 Perry Atkinson, President
 Dallas Rhoden, Vice President
 Jason Atkinson, Secretary / Treasurer
 Hal Short, Chairman of the Board
 Mark Portrait, Director
 Ted Darnell, Director

Translators
KDOV rebroadcasts on KDPO 91.9 in Port Orford, Oregon, KDCB 89.5 in Coos Bay, Oregon, KDOB 91.5 in Brookings, Oregon, KICE 94.9 in Terrebonne/Redmond/Bend, Oregon, and on the following translators:

See also 
 Focus On The Family
 Moody Radio (In The Market with Janet Parshall)

References

External links
Official Website

DOV
DOV
Contemporary Christian radio stations in the United States
Medford, Oregon
Radio stations established in 1995
1995 establishments in Oregon